Huia Edmonds (born 20 October 1981) is an Australian retired professional rugby union footballer. He played for the Waratahs, Stormers and the Brumbies in Super Rugby before earning four caps for Australia playing at hooker. He later played for Gloucester in England and RC Narbonne in France.

Early life
Edmonds was born in Ashburton, New Zealand and educated at Erindale College in Canberra. He played for the Australian Schoolboys team in 1998 and the Australian under-19 and under-21 teams in 2000 and 2002 respectively.

Rugby career
In 2002 he was recruited by the NSW Waratahs and made his Super 12 debut against the Bulls. Edmonds spent several seasons in South Africa, playing for Western Province in the Currie Cup and the Stormers in Super 14, before returning to Canberra to join the ACT Brumbies for the 2007 season.

In 2010, Edmonds made his test debut against Fiji. He then went on to score his maiden test try against Wales in the Spring Tour.

He was scheduled to sign for Saracens for the 2011 season, however due to injury to his shoulder followed by a broken foot this deal fell through. Edmonds signed for English side Gloucester Rugby on a two-year contract in 2012. He then moved to France in late 2014 to join Pro D2 team RC Narbonne, where he played for three seasons.

Edmonds joined Eastern Suburbs Rugby Union Club in Canberra as the assistant coach.

References

External links
SARugby.com profile
Sky Sports profile

1981 births
Australian rugby union players
Australia international rugby union players
Rugby union players from Ashburton, New Zealand
ACT Brumbies players
New South Wales Waratahs players
Stormers players
Western Province (rugby union) players
Rugby union hookers
Living people
Gloucester Rugby players
New Zealand emigrants to Australia
Australian expatriate rugby union players
Expatriate rugby union players in England
Australian expatriate sportspeople in England
Australian expatriate sportspeople in France